Calcium release-activated calcium channel protein 1 is a calcium selective ion channel that in humans is encoded by the ORAI1 gene. Orai channels play  an important role in the activation of T-lymphocytes. The loss of function mutation of Orai1 causes severe combined immunodeficiency (SCID) in humans  The mammalian orai family has two additional homologs, Orai2 and Orai3. Orai proteins share no homology with any other ion channel family of any other known proteins. They have 4 transmembrane domains and form hexamers.

Structure and function 
Orai channels are activated upon the depletion of internal calcium stores, which is called the "store-operated" or the "capacitative" mechanism. They are molecular constituents of the "calcium release activated calcium currents" (ICRAC). Upon activation of phospholipase C by various cell surface receptors, inositol trisphosphate is formed that releases calcium from the endoplasmic reticulum. The decreased calcium concentration in the endoplasmic reticulum is sensed by the STIM1 protein. STIM1 clusters upon the depletion of the calcium stores and forms "puncta", and relocates near the plasma membrane, where it activates Orai1 via protein-protein interaction.

In 2012, a 3.35-angstrom (Å) crystal structure of the Drosophila Orai channel, which shares 73% sequence identity with human Orai1 within its transmembrane region, was published. The structure, thought to show the closed state of the channel, revealed that a single channel is composed of six Orai subunits, with the transmembrane domains arranged in concentric rings around a central aqueous pore formed exclusively by the first transmembrane helix of each subunit. Transmembrane helices 2 and 3 surround TM1 and are hypothesized to shield it from the surrounding lipid bilayer and provide structural support. The fourth transmembrane helix forms the outermost layer.

Ligands
Inhibitors
 CM-4620

References